Sylvie Riedle (22 February 1969) is a former French racing cyclist. She won the French national road race title in 1997.

References

External links

1969 births
Living people
French female cyclists
Sportspeople from Moselle (department)
Cyclists from Grand Est